Dulcilene Moraes (born 22 January 1953 in Rio de Janeiro), known professionally as Dhu Moraes is a Brazilian actress and singer. She started the career using the stage name Dudu Moraes, turning after to use Dhu Moraes.

She was member of the vocal group As Frenéticas and also member of the groups Mucamas do Painho and Radio Stars, both consequences of her participations in programs of Chico Anysio, Chico Anysio Show. In the 1970s, beyond having taken part of the producing of the Hair, took part of a group "Sublimes", inspired in The Supremes. From 2001 until 2006, she represented the character Tia Nastácia in the series Sítio do Picapau Amarelo of Rede Globo.

TV career 
 2016 – Êta Mundo Bom! – Manuela
 2012 – Cheias de Charme – Valda
 2011 – Morde & Assopra – Janice
 2009 – Caras e Bocas – Dirce
 2007 – Luz do Sol Record – Neusa
 2001 – Sítio do Picapau Amarelo – Tia Nastácia
 2001 – O Direito de Nascer – Mamãe Dolores
 2001 – Você Decide – Transas de Família: Part 5
 1994 – Escolinha do Professor Raimundo – Maria Menininha
 1991 – Escolinha do Professor Raimundo – Baunilha
 1986 – Sinhá Moça – Maria das Dores
 1985 – Tenda dos Milagres – Rosa de Oxalá
 1970 – Irmãos Coragem

References 

Brazilian actresses
20th-century Brazilian women singers
20th-century Brazilian singers
Musicians from Rio de Janeiro (city)
1953 births
Living people
Brazilian Buddhists
Converts to Sōka Gakkai 
Members of Sōka Gakkai
Nichiren Buddhists